An Arrow's Flight  is a 1998 novel by Mark Merlis.

Plot summary
Pyrrhus lives in the city with his housemate Leucon. He works as a waiter, then as a hustler. One day he hears his father Achilles has left him some inheritance in Troy, and he decides to claim it. On the ship, he sleeps with Corythus, a sailor. He soon learns he needs to seduce Philoctetes and get his bow for a prophecy to come true. He grows attached to the old man, though the latter also has an affair with Paris. Finally, Philoctetes breaks the bow. Pyrrhus meets Leucon again in a hospital where Pyrrhus is waiting to see his lover Philoctetes, who is very sick; the latter realizes he no longer has feelings for Pyrrhus. Pyrrhus understands that he has grown and accepted his sexuality and is able to live openly, something Leucon cannot do. (The novel hints that he probably never will.)

Main characters
 Pyrrhus, the protagonist.
 Leucon
 Odysseus
 Philoctetes
 Corythus
 Paris

Literary significance
 1999 Lambda Literary Award for Gay Men's Fiction
 It is a retelling of Sophocles's Philoctetes. It was inspired by Edmund Wilson's essay entitled 'The Wound and the Bow'. It was also inspired by Christopher Logue and Robinson Jeffers.
 It has been read as a sequel to Andrew Holleran's Dancer from the Dance.

References

1998 American novels
Lambda Literary Award-winning works
Novels with gay themes
American LGBT novels
1990s LGBT novels
St. Martin's Press books